China Fights Back: An American Woman With the Eighth Route Army  was a 1938 book by Agnes Smedley.  It was a diary of her time with the Chinese Communist Eighth Route Army in the early stages of the Second Sino-Japanese War.

Released in the United States and Great Britain, it was much less successful than her earlier China books.  Smedley included some of the same material in a later book, Battle Hymn of China, which did much better.

References 

1938 non-fiction books
Books about China
Books about communism
Second Sino-Japanese War